The Czech village of Štěrboholy was founded in 1371, and became part of Prague in 1968. Now it is its own cadastral area, part of the administrative district Prague 15.

Its area is 2.97 km2, its population is 2,172 and its population density is 731 inhabitants / km2.

Šterboholy became known during the Seven Years' War on 6 May 1757. That day was the Battle of Prague, where Frederick II the Great defeated the Austrian troops of Charles Alexander of Lorraine.

References 

Districts of Prague